Zhang Cunren (styled Wanzhen 完真, d. 1652) was a Chinese official during the early Qing dynasty and the first Viceroy of Min-Zhe (under the title Viceroy of Zhe-Min), appointed between 1645 and 1647.

Born during the Ming dynasty, he served as a military commander on the northeastern frontier. He defected to the Qing dynasty in 1631 and was assigned to the Bordered Blue Banner of Han forces. After the Qing forces took over China in 1644, he was appointed Viceroy of Zhejiang and Fujian, as well as Minister of War. During this period, he participated in the Qing dynasty's southward campaigns, arresting and killing Ma Shiying, a leading official of the Southern Ming.

References

Viceroys of Min-Zhe
Qing dynasty politicians from Liaoning
Ming dynasty politicians
Politicians from Jinzhou